Thomas's horseshoe bat (Rhinolophus thomasi) is a species of bat in the family Rhinolophidae. It is found in China, Laos, Myanmar, Thailand, and Vietnam.

References

Rhinolophidae
Mammals described in 1905
Taxa named by Knud Andersen
Taxonomy articles created by Polbot
Bats of Asia
Bats of Southeast Asia